Professor Hugh Alexander Webster , FRSGS (1849 – 7 January 1926) was a Scottish teacher, librarian and encyclopaedist.

Biography
The son of Rev David Webster and Isabella McKinnon, Hugh Webster was born in Laurencekirk, Kincardineshire, and educated first privately by his father and later at Edinburgh University (1878–80). He became a teacher at Merchiston Castle Academy and later Librarian at the University.

He was a member of a group of encyclopaedists working in Edinburgh in the late 19th century including William Robertson Smith (editor of the Encyclopædia Britannica and contributor to the Encyclopaedia Biblica); David Patrick (editor of Chambers's Encyclopaedia, Chambers's Biographical Dictionary, and Chambers's Cyclopaedia of English Literature); J Sutherland Black (editor of Encyclopaedia Biblica); George Sandeman, (editor in chief of Nelson's Encyclopaedia) and Patrick Geddes.

Hugh Webster was fluent in fourteen languages which allowed him to access sources from European and Asian writers.

Patrick Geddes, writing from Montpellier in 1926 said:

Geddes also reported a comment from his friend and colleague George Sandeman 

Hugh Webster was one of four sub-editors of the 9th edition of the Encyclopædia Britannica, published in 1888 and known as "The Scholar's Edition". He authored the articles on Borneo, the Celebes islands, Colombia, Korea, the Danube, the Druse people of Syria, Ecuador, Frankfort-on-the-Main, Geneva, Guiana, Hainan, the Indian archipelago, Italy, Java, Montenegro, the river Niger, the river Nile, Patagonia, The Philippines, Réunion, Rio de Janeiro, the Sahara, Sierra Leone, and Sumatra.

Hugh Webster was elected a Fellow of the Royal Society of Edinburgh FRSE on 2 May 1887 proposed by Sir John Murray, William Evans Hoyle, Robert Gray, Alexander Buchan. His election was cancelled in 1896–7.

He was a founder member and the first Honorary Fellow of the Scottish Geographical Society and edited the Society's magazine for several years.

Hugh Webster had intense powers of mental application and was quite capable of forgetting both time and place. He was also generous to those who were less fortunate, a trait he attributed to his experiences when his father was Chaplain to the Poorhouse and Prison in Linlithgow.

Hugh Webster became an alcoholic. The University granted him several furloughs but in the end he developed delirum tremens, had a breakdown, lost his job as Librarian and was confined to home. He lived in London for some years in reduced circumstances, and then returned to Edinburgh to live with his daughter Maud and her husband John Janes. Somewhere in this period he stopped drinking.

In his later years he used to take students from the university to prepare them for the Entrance Examination in English. These were mainly from India, China, Korea and Africa.

Personal life
Webster was the son of the Rev David Webster and Isabella McKinnon. He married Mary Fyfe Clark (1850–1919), daughter of Alexander Clark in 1878. In 1890 they are listed as living in quarters at Old College on Edinburgh University grounds. Around 1900, with a growing family, they moved to 3 John Street in Portobello just east of the city. By 1910 they had left Edinburgh.

They later lived for many years in Duddingston, Portobello, Edinburgh. He was survived by two of his six children, Maud and Frieda.

See also 

 Ordnance Gazetteer of Scotland: A Graphic and Accurate Description of Every Place in Scotland (Webster contributed five sections)

References

1849 births
1926 deaths
Scottish encyclopedists
Scottish librarians
Fellows of the Royal Society of Edinburgh
Alumni of the University of Edinburgh